David Rosier is a French scriptwriter and film producer.

Life and work
Rosier graduated with a Masters in Philosophy at Paris X Nanterre University. He started working as a freelance script reader and co-wrote several screenplays including Manzanar Mangrove (2002) and La Clef des Songes (2003). He was also assistant director for a number of television shows, including Caravane de Nuit (France2) and started working in production in 2004.

He founded in 2006 his first production company, Moondog Production in which he developed a documentary series for Arte in 2008, Passeurs D'Univers. He also produced more than a hundred commercials, educational films and interactive experiences for Institutions and corporations (Generali, Louis Vuitton, AT&T...).

As he is involved in preserving nature and indigenous peoples rights he co-created in 2009 the NGO Nature Rights.

In 2011 he created Decia Films and produced his first feature film, The Salt of the Earth, which was co-directed by Wim Wenders and Juliano Ribeiro Salgado in which he is also co- writer. The film won a Jury Prize, in Cannes at Un Certain Regard, in 2014  the film won the Cesar for Best Documentary and was nominated for an Oscar for Best Documentary Film the same year.

In 2015 he studied at the CEEA in Paris to complete his skills in storytelling for films, before producing and co-writing his second feature film for cinema, Pope Francis: A Man of His Word, directed by Wim Wenders.

In 2019 David Rosier founded the Reveal Media group, which includes Decia Films (film production), Foehn Films (advertising) and Capstan Films Services (executive production). The group is a signatory to the Ecoprod charter.

Filmography 

 2014 - The Salt of the Earth (producer and scriptwriter)
 2018: Pope Francis - A Man of His Word (producer and scriptwriter)

Awards and nominations 
Together with directors Wim Wenders and Juliano Ribeiro Salgado, he is nominated for their documentary The Salt of the Earth in the category of Best Documentary at the Oscars 2015. This film won the César for best documentary in 2015.

References

External links 

 Unifrance
 Reveal Media
 Decia Films

1973 births
University of Paris alumni
Living people
French screenwriters
French film producers